Paopi 10 - Coptic Calendar - Paopi 12

The eleventh day of the Coptic month of Paopi, the second month of the Coptic year. On a common year, this day corresponds to October 8, of the Julian Calendar, and October 21, of the Gregorian Calendar. This day falls in the Coptic season of Peret, the season of emergence.

Commemorations

Saints 

 The departure of Saint James the Patriarch of Antioch 
 The departure of Saint Pelagia the Pertinent

References 

Days of the Coptic calendar